Missisquoi Valley Union (MVU) is a middle and high school, grades 7-12, located in Swanton, Vermont, United States. MVU's campus contains two main buildings. The school serves the communities of Swanton, Highgate, and Franklin. Students from Sheldon and Alburgh are given the choice to attend MVU or another surrounding school. There were 902 students and 94 teachers for the 2014-2015 school year. MVU is located just off exit 21 of I-89. MVU and UVM is a palindrome.

Infrastructure 
Misssiquoi Valley Union's main/original building was constructed in an open design format with five circular self-contained "pods" to house the more than 1000 expected students. On campus there are four soccer fields, two baseball fields, three softball fields, a track, and a football field. There is also an agricultural building that houses cows, pigs, sheep, donkey, etc. that are raised by the students. The beef is used for lunch at the school. In the building there is a gym that is used for basketball and volleyball. The building also contains the Trahan Theater which is used to host the school's annual Skit Nite and Musical. It is also used for concerts, award ceremonies and assemblies. The gym is also used for assemblies.

Athletics 
The school mascot is the Thunderbird and blue and white are the school colors. The school competes in the following sports

Fall Sports 
Field Hockey
Girls Soccer
Boys Soccer
Football
Cross Country
Boys Golf
Girls Golf
Girls Volleyball
Boys Volleyball

Winter Sports 
Boys Basketball
Girls Basketball
Cheer leading
Dance Team
Girls Ice Hockey
Boys Ice Hockey
Indoor Track

Spring Sports 
Softball
Baseball
Girls Golf
Boys Golf
Outdoor Track
Each year in the fall any senior girls can participate in the Powder Puff football game against the long time rival BFA St. Albans. The game raises money for kids with cancer.

MVU Football 
Despite being one of the largest high schools in the state of Vermont, Missisquoi Valley Union High School did not field a football team of any variety until 2014. Prior to 2014, several attempts were made to obtain funding through the school's budget, but the motion was voted down each time...most recently in 2016. As a result, the team continued on their own and raised the money themselves in order to fund the program. In 2014, the program received a $10,000 grant from the Vermont chapter of the National Football Foundation as well as donated gear from Middlebury College and the New England Patriots among other organizations. After a lot of hard work and determination, the MVU Thunderbirds made their debut in the fall 2014 season on a JV schedule and finished with a 5-2 record. They remained on a JV schedule for the 2015 season as well, also finishing with a 5-2 record.

The 2016 season marked the varsity debut of the MVU Thunderbird football program. Even though the rest of the athletic programs at MVU play in Division 1 or 2, the football program began its varsity journey in Division 3. An eventual move up to Division 2 or 1 is expected once the team is able to gain more varsity experience. Unfortunately, the MVU Thunderbirds finished their inaugural season with an 0-7 record and were outscored 313-48. The Thunderbirds won their first game as a varsity program on October 21, 2017 when they beat their rivals at BFA Fairfax 54-24.

Music and Drama 
Missisquoi has held a musical and Skit Nite annually since its first year of operation. For Skit Nite each class; freshmen, sophomores, juniors, and seniors, create an original play that is no more than half an hour long. All classes compete against each other for victory and bragging rights. There are two nights to perform for an audience and graduates serve as judges to determine the winner. However the judges do not know any of the students so there is no bias. MVU has auditions for the musical in November and practices from January to the beginning of April,  at which time the musical is held. Grades 7-12 may participate.
2022 - Mary Poppins
2019 - The Addams Family
2018 - Big Fish
2017 - Young Frankenstein
2016 - The Little Mermaid
2015 - Shrek the Musical
2014 - Annie
2013 - Singin' in the Rain
2012 - The Wizard of Oz
2011 - Seussical
2010 - Into the Woods
2007 - Beauty and the Beast
2006 - The Music Man
2005 - Bye Bye Birdie
2004 - Once Upon a Mattress
2003 - Leader of the Pack
2002 - Godspell
2001 - Our Town
2000 - Man of La Mancha
1999 - Brigadoon
1998 - The Fantasticks
1997 - Barnum
1996 - Guys and Dolls
1995 - Jesus Christ Superstar
1994 - Oklahoma!
1993 - Little Shop of Horrors
1992 - The Wizard of Oz
1991 - Into the Woods
1990 - Starmites
1989 - The Pirates of Penzance
1988 - Joseph and the Amazing Technicolor Dreamcoat
1987 - Oliver!
1986 - West Side Story
1985 - Godspell
1984 - Anything Goes

MVU has a middle school chorus, a high school concert chorus, and Mastersingers, a more advanced high school chorus. MVU also has a middle school band, a middle school string ensemble, a high school concert band, a jazz band, and a wind ensemble, a more advanced high school band. The band director, Aron Garceau from the band Prydein, selects talented students and adults to play in the pit band for the musical. Both the high school concert band and wind ensemble march at the St. Albans Maple Festival at the end of April and the Memorial Day parades at the surrounding towns of Swanton, Highgate, and Franklin on Memorial Day. The Vermont All State Music Festival was held at MVU in May 1992 and was held at MVU again in May 2016.

A notable former band director was Brooke Ostrander, who was previously the keyboard/flute player in Wicked Lester, the band that eventually became KISS.

References 

Public middle schools in Vermont
Public high schools in Vermont
Schools in Franklin County, Vermont